Remigio Daniel Molina (November 6, 1970 – September 18, 2016) was an Argentine professional boxer in the Lightweight division. He also represented Argentina at the 1992 Barcelona Olympic Games.

Amateur career
He died in Concordia, on 17 September 2016, while playing a football match.
Molina had very good amateur career and represented Argentina at the 1992 Barcelona Olympic Games, losing against Mohammed Achik in the Quarterfinals .

Pro career

WBC Super Bantamweight Championship
In April 1998, Remigio was knocked out by WBC Super Bantamweight Champion, Mexican Érik Morales at Tijuana, Baja California, Mexico.

Professional boxing record 

|- style="margin:0.5em-size:95%;"
|align="center" colspan=8|38 Wins (14 knockouts), 8 Losses, 1 Draw
|- style="margin:0.5em auto; font-size:95%;"
|align=center style="border-style: none none solid solid; background: #e3e3e3"|Res.
|align=center style="border-style: none none solid solid; background: #e3e3e3"|Record
|align=center style="border-style: none none solid solid; background: #e3e3e3"|Opponent
|align=center style="border-style: none none solid solid; background: #e3e3e3"|Type
|align=center style="border-style: none none solid solid; background: #e3e3e3"|Rd., Time
|align=center style="border-style: none none solid solid; background: #e3e3e3"|Date
|align=center style="border-style: none none solid solid; background: #e3e3e3"|Location
|align=center style="border-style: none none solid solid; background: #e3e3e3"|Notes
|-align=center
|Loss||38-8-1||align=left| Levan Kirakosyan
|
|||||align=left|
|align=left|
|-align=center
|Win ||38-7-1 ||align=left| Jorge Daniel Medina
|||  ||  ||align=left|
|align=left|
|- align=center 
|Loss ||37-7-1 ||align=left| Juan Gerardo Cabrera
|||  ||  ||align=left|
|align=left|
|- align=center 
|Loss ||37-6-1 ||align=left| Juan Gerardo Cabrera
|||  ||  ||align=left|
|align=left|
|- align=center
|Win ||37-5-1 ||align=left| Nestor Martin Farias
|||  ||  ||align=left|
|align=left|
|- align=center 
|Win ||36-5-1 ||align=left| Julio Gonzalez
|||  ||  ||align=left|
|align=left|
|- align=center 
|Loss ||35-5-1 ||align=left| Pastor Humberto Maurin
|||  ||  ||align=left|
|align=left|
|- align=center 
|Loss ||35-4-1 ||align=left| Juan Manuel Marquez
|||  ||  ||align=left|
|align=left|
|- align=center 
|Draw ||35-3-1 ||align=left| Miguel Angel Albarado
|||  ||  ||align=left|
|align=left|
|- align=center 
|Win ||35-3 ||align=left| Rodolfo Sergio Javier Lauria
|||  ||  ||align=left|
|align=left|
|- align=center 
|Loss ||34-3 ||align=left| Julio Pablo Chacon
|||  ||  ||align=left|
|align=left|
|- align=center 
|Win ||34-2 ||align=left| Miguel Angel Albarado
|||  ||  ||align=left|
|align=left|
|- align=center 
|Win ||33-2 ||align=left| Renor Rojas Claure
|||  ||  ||align=left|
|align=left|
|- align=center 
|Win ||32-2 ||align=left| Ruben Ricardo Astorga
|||  ||  ||align=left|
|align=left|
|- align=center 
|Loss ||31-2 ||align=left| Erik Morales
|||  ||  ||align=left|
|align=left|
|- align=center 
|Win ||31-1 ||align=left| Ruben Osvaldo Condori
|||  ||  ||align=left|
|align=left|
|- align=center 
|Win ||30-1 ||align=left| Renor Rojas Claure
|||  ||  ||align=left|
|align=left|
|- align=center 
|Win ||29-1 ||align=left| Sergio Rafael Liendo
|||  ||  ||align=left|
|align=left|
|- align=center 
|Win ||28-1 ||align=left| Ruben Osvaldo Condori
|||  ||  ||align=left|
|align=left|
|- align=center 
|Loss ||27-1 ||align=left| Naseem Hamed
|||  ||  ||align=left|
|align=left|
|- align=center

References

External links

Olympic boxers of Argentina
Boxers at the 1992 Summer Olympics
Lightweight boxers
1970 births
2016 deaths
Argentine male boxers
People from Concordia, Entre Ríos
Sportspeople from Entre Ríos Province